Dane Allan Smith is a Creative Producer specializing in digital media. He is known for his work on Dune  (2022), Rings of Power  (2022),Avengers Endgame (2021),Star Wars: Episode VIII - The Last Jedi (2017), Shang Chi and the Legend of the Ten Rings (2021),The Mandalorian (TV Series) and Jungle Cruise 2021. Dane currently directs Global Operations as Chief Stategy Office(CSO) at The Third Floor.

Education 
Smith attended York University in Toronto. He graduated with a Communications major in 1984.

Career

Menithings Productions 
In 1999, Smith founded Menithings Productions  which contributed visual effects for Hellboy (film). Menithings also produced The Freak  and Battle for Terra, two short CGI animated films that earned a variety of awards at multiple film festivals. Smith helped with the original feature films for the company and in 2008 Battle for Terra was released. For his work on Battle of Terra, he won the Grand Prize for Best Animated Feature at the 2008 Ottawa International Animation Festival.

Stereoscopic Conversion 
Smith's work on stereoscopic conversion included being a stereo producer  on director James Cameron's Deepsea Challenge 3D production. He managed over 1,400 shots that featured modeling, lighting, particle animation, compositing and stereoscopic conversion. In addition Dane helped design the proprietary pipeline deployed to convert BATTLE FOR TERRA to stereoscopic 3D for theatrical release along with Harry Potter and The Deathly Hallows Part 1, Harry Potter and The Deathly Hallows Part 2, RIPD, and Hansel & Gretel: Witch Hunters.

Gnomon School of Visual Effects 
In 2010 he joined the Gnomon School of Visual Effects as faculty where he instructs students in courses that include: Virtual Reality Production, The History of Visual Effects, and Stereoscopic Filmmaking techniques and practices. In 2021 , in partnership with Epic Unreal Smith launched the first ever Virtual Production course of Study at Gnomon School of VFX and Gaming

Visual Effects 
Smith has been the Visual Effects Producer  on numerous VFX driven features, including The Walk (2015 film), Oblivion (2013 film), Deepsea Challenge 3D, Harry Potter and the Deathly Hallows – Part 1 & 2, The Amazing Spider-Man (2012 film) & Looper (film). In 2015 Smith was the Visual Effects Producer  on Anomalisa directed by Charlie Kaufman. The film was nominated for an Oscar under the category for best animated feature.

Visualization / Virtual Production 
In 2017 Dane joined THE THIRD FLOOR. Dane currently serves as CSO and is the key representative to clients (Studio Management, Directors and Producers), as well as business unit employees, and the managing board throughout the global organization. Dane 
oversees the development of projects where previs, virtual production and real-time rendering are making significant in-roads. He manages the deployment of technology that can render high-quality visuals in real-time and works really well with real-world input devices such as mocap and cameras. His hybrid Maya/Unreal approach offers a lot of great advantages and allows his team to more easily provide tools like a virtual camera (Vcam), VR scouting and AR on-set apps.

Virtual Reality 
Smith founded Ember Immersive in 2015 to bring premium cinematic VR experiences to the world through distribution/production of content, products (e.g. cameras), and VR Technology. Smith produced Stan Lee's Cosmic Crusaders VR. The debut episode will be presented in virtual reality, with one episode airing each day during Comic-Con International 2016 via smartphone VR viewers to be handed out at the show.

Producers Guild of America 

Smith is also a member of the PGA  as a PGA Innovation Award Jury, Power of Diversity Master workshop and the Animation and Visual Effects Committee.

Author 

Smith curated and expanded the Visual Effects Society Handbook Volume 3 ,as an Editor, wrote contributing content, and curated contributors to The Virtual Production Field Guide V02. He is currently editing a special edition of the VES Handbook, dedicated entirely to Virtual Production.

Public Speaking 
Smith has spoken at multiple engagements including, SIGGRAPH, CES, the PGA Animation Committee panels, ASIFA/WONDERCON panel 2019, Comicon  VES, VRLA, LA Games Conference 2019, NAB Shanghai 2019, VR on The LOT, DIGITAL HOLLYWOOD. Otis College of Art and Design Digital Media Panels  SXSW 2020, 2021, 2022  Visual Effects Society Vision Committee 2020 IAAPA 2021 EXPO  as well as The World Animation & VFX Summit  and keynote speaker at NAB 2021 and HPA 2022 Palm Springs, CA

Awards 
 2022 THEA Award Outstanding Achievement – Attraction for The Secret Life of Pets – Off the Leash! at Universal Studios Hollywood 
 2022 Outstanding Achievement – Technical Innovation for Mario Kart: Koopa's Challenge at Universal Studios Japan 
 2022 Outstanding Achievement – Theme Park Land for Super Nintendo World at Universal Studios Japan
 2019 Promax Games Awards Far Cry 5: Story Trailer
 2019 CLIO Kait, Broken Games Award
 2017 Telly Awards, Won Bronze Telly for Stan Lee's Cosmic Crusaders: VR Experience 
 2017 Telly Award Race Through New York with Jimmy Fallon
 2016 Academy Awards Best Animated Feature Nomination Anomalisa
 2009 Philadelphia FirstGlance Film Festival, FirstGlance Award for Berni's Doll 
 2008 Giffoni Film Festival, Won Silver Gryphon for Terra 
 2004 Academy Award Best Short Film Nomination Animated Destino

Notable film and television work 
 Mission: Impossible - Dead Reckoning - Part One (2023) : (film)
 The Batman (2023) : (film)
 Guardians of The Galaxy Vol. 3 (2023) : (film)
 Ant-Man and the Wasp: Quantumania  : (film)
 Shazam : Fury of the Gods  (2023) : (film)
 The Lord of the Rings: The Rings of Power(TV Series)
 Willow (TV Series)
 Andor(TV Series)
 Severance (TV Series)
 Megalopolis : (film)
 Avengers: Endgame (film)
 Star Wars: Episode IX - The Rise of Skywalker (film)
 Star Wars: Episode VIII - The Last Jedi(film)
 Shang-Chi and the Legend of the Ten Rings (film)
 The Tomorrow War (film) 
 Godzilla vs. Kong (film) 
 For All Mankind (TV Series)
 WandaVision (TV Series) 
 The Suicide Squad (film)
Lovecraft Country (2020) 
The Boys (2019) 
 The Mandalorian (2019) 
 Aquaman (2018) 
 Joker (2019) 
 Captain Marvel (2019) 
 Solo: A Star Wars Story (2018) 
 Ant-man and the Wasp (2018)
 Avengers: Infinity War (2018)
 Star Wars: Episode VIII - The Last Jedi (2017)
 Spider-Man: Far From Home (2019) 
 Anomalisa (2015)
 The Man in the High Castle (2015)
 Game of Thrones (2015)
 Transformers: Age of Extinction (2014)
 Deepsea Challenge 3D (2014)
 Thor: The Dark World (2013)
 Star Trek Into Darkness (2013)
 Looper (2012)
 The Amazing Spider-Man (2012)
 Harry Potter and the Deathly Hallows – Part 2 (2011)
 Harry Potter and the Deathly Hallows – Part 1 (2010)
 Battle for Terra (2007)
 Titanic (1997)

References 

Year of birth missing (living people)
Living people
Canadian company founders
Canadian entertainment industry businesspeople
York University alumni